Here is a list of notable hackers who are known for their hacking acts.

0–9

0x80

A

 Mark Abene (Phiber Optik)
 Ryan Ackroyd (Kayla)
 Mustafa Al-Bassam (Tflow)
 Mitch Altman
 Jacob Appelbaum (ioerror)
 Julian Assange (Mendax)
 Trishneet Arora
 Andrew Auernheimer (weev)

B

 Loyd Blankenship (The Mentor)
 Erik Bloodaxe
 Barrett Brown
Max Butler

C

 Brad Carter (RBCP, Red box Chili Pepper)
 Jean-Bernard Condat
 Sam Curry
 Cyber Anakin

D

 Kim Dotcom
 John Draper (Captain Crunch)
 Sir Dystic

E

 Alexandra Elbakyan
 Mohamed Elnouby
 Farid Essebar
 Nahshon Even-Chaim (Phoenix)

F

 Ankit Fadia
 Bruce Fancher (Dead Lord)

G

 Joe Grand (Kingpin)
 Richard Greenblatt
 Virgil Griffith (Romanpoet)
 Rop Gonggrijp
 Guccifer
 Guccifer 2.0

H

 Jeremy Hammond
 Susan Headley (Susan Thunder)
 Markus Hess
 George Hotz (geohot)
 Andrew Huang
Marcus Hutchins

I

J

The Jester (hacktivist)
 Jonathan James
 Joybubbles (Joe Engressia, Highrise Joe)

K

 Kyle Milliken
Samy Kamkar
 Karl Koch (hagbard)
 Alan Kotok
Jan Krissler
 Patrick K. Kroupa (Lord Digital)
 Kris Kaspersky
 Tillie Kottmann

L

 Adrian Lamo  
 Chris Lamprecht (Minor Threat)
 Gordon Lyon (Fyodor)

M

 MafiaBoy
Moxie Marlinspike
 Morgan Marquis-Boire
 Gary Mckinnon (Solo)
 Jude Milhon (St. Jude)
 Kevin Mitnick (Condor)
 Mixter
 Hector Monsegur (Sabu)
 HD Moore
 Robert Tappan Morris (rtm)
 Dennis Moran (Coolio)
 Jeff Moss (Dark Tangent)
 Katie Moussouris
 Andy Müller-Maguhn
 MLT (Matthew Telfer)

N

 Craig Neidorf (Knight Lightning)

O
 Beto O'Rourke (Psychedelic Warlord)
Higinio Ochoa

P

 Justin Tanner Petersen (Agent Steal)
 Kevin Poulsen (Dark Dante)

Q

R

 Eric S. Raymond (ESR)
 Christien Rioux (DilDog)
 Leonard Rose (Terminus)
 Oxblood Ruffin
 Joanna Rutkowska

S

 Peter Samson
 David Schrooten (Fortezza)
 Roman Seleznev (Track2)
 Alisa Shevchenko
 Rich Skrenta
 Dmitry Sklyarov
 Edward Snowden
 Space Rogue
 Richard Stallman (rms)
 StankDawg
 Matt Suiche
Peter Sunde
 Gottfrid Svartholm (Anakata)
 Kristina Svechinskaya
 Aaron Swartz

T

 Ehud Tenenbaum
 Cris Thomas (Space Rogue)
 John Threat
 Topiary
 Tron (Boris Floricic)
Justine Tunney

U

V
Kimberley Vanvaeck (Gigabyte)

W

 Steve Wozniak
 Chris Wysopal (Weld Pond)
Robert Willis

X

Y

 YTCracker

Z

 Peiter Zatko (Mudge)

See also 
 Tech Model Railroad Club
 List of computer criminals
 List of fictional hackers
 List of hacker groups
 List of hacker conferences
 Hackerspace
 Phreaking

References 

Hacker culture
 
Hackers
Hackers